Bayern mobil was a German, public radio station owned and operated by the Bayerischer Rundfunk (BR) which was on-air from 1 January 1998 to 31 August 2008 as part of the DAB pilot project in Bavaria.

Programming
The music range of Bayern mobil was wide and went from oldies of the 60s to current chart hits. Most of the songs were in English, German, French and Italian. The list of titles was compiled by a dedicated editorial team.

Bayern mobil was automated and aired the news from Bayern 3 hourly from 7 a.m. to 10:30 p.m. In addition, there were traffic and weather reports every half hour.

At irregular intervals, programmes were organized in which the listeners could request music titles by telephone or e-mail. Announcements of these broadcasts could be read in the radiotext and were read out in the weather and traffic block.

Termination
With I Believe by Joana Zimmer, the last title was played on Bayern mobil at 8 a.m. on September 1, 2008. At 8 o'clock Bayern plus took over all frequencies of the program.

References

Bayerischer Rundfunk
Defunct radio stations in Germany
Radio stations established in 1998
Radio stations disestablished in 2008
1998 establishments in Germany
2008 disestablishments in Germany
Mass media in Munich